Okubay Tsegay (born 1 January 1986) is an Eritrean long-distance runner. In 2019, he competed in the men's marathon at the 2019 World Athletics Championships held in Doha, Qatar. He did not finish.

In 2018, he competed in the 2018 Berlin Marathon. He finished in 7th place. He also finished in 7th place in the 2021 Berlin Marathon.

References

External links 
 

Living people
1986 births
Place of birth missing (living people)
Eritrean male long-distance runners
Eritrean male marathon runners
World Athletics Championships athletes for Eritrea